Leslie Cameron Harvey (13 September 1944 – 3 May 1972) was a Scottish guitarist in several bands of the late 1960s and early 1970s, most notably Stone the Crows. He was the brother of Alex Harvey.

Biography 

Harvey was born in Govan, Glasgow. In the 1960s, he was asked to join the Animals by Alan Price but chose to stay with his brother in the Alex Harvey Soul Band. He later joined the Blues Council, another Scottish band. The Blues Council made one record, Baby Don't Look Down. In March 1965, their tour van crashed, killing vocalist Fraser Calder and bassist James Giffen, and the rest of the band went their separate ways.

In 1969, Harvey joined Scottish band Cartoone to record some tracks for their second album. He also accompanied Cartoone on their live tour of the United States supporting Led Zeppelin. They also supported the US band Spirit in 1969. John Lee Hooker, whose songs both Harvey and Cartoone used to cover on their tour of the UK, was their opening act. In December 1969 Harvey played guitar on Maurice Gibb's The Loner album, but only the single "Railroad" was released.

Harvey was a co-founder of Stone the Crows in late 1969. While on stage with Stone the Crows at Swansea Top Rank in 1972, he was electrocuted when he touched a microphone that was not earthed while the fingers of his other hand were holding the strings of his guitar. It has been incorrectly stated that the incident happened "on a rainy day with puddles on the stage", however, Swansea Top Rank was an indoor venue and therefore this was not possible. A roadie attempted to unplug the guitar, but was unsuccessful. Harvey died from his injuries, aged 27.

References 

Scottish male guitarists
1944 births
1972 deaths
Accidental deaths by electrocution
Musicians from Glasgow
Musicians who died on stage
Accidental deaths in Wales
Scottish rock guitarists
20th-century Scottish musicians
Lead guitarists
20th-century British guitarists
20th-century British male musicians